The Connecticut class of pre-dreadnought battleships were the penultimate class of the type built for the United States Navy. This arrangement was rendered obsolete by the advent of all-big-gun battleships like the British , which was completed before most of the Connecticuts entered service.

Nevertheless, the ships had active careers. The first five ships took part in the cruise of the Great White Fleet in 1907–1909—New Hampshire had not entered service. From 1909 onward, they served as the workhorses of the US Atlantic Fleet, conducting training exercises and showing the flag in Europe and Central America. As unrest broke out in several Central American countries in the 1910s, the ships became involved in police actions in the region. The most significant was the American intervention in the Mexican Revolution during the occupation of Veracruz in April 1914.

During the American participation in World War I, the Connecticut-class ships were used to train sailors for an expanding wartime fleet. In late 1918, they began to escort convoys to Europe, and in September that year, Minnesota was badly damaged by a mine laid by the German U-boat . After the war, they were used to bring American soldiers back from France and later as training ships. The 1922 Washington Naval Treaty, which mandated major reductions in naval weapons, cut the ships' careers short. Within two years, all six ships had been sold for scrap.

Design
The United States' victory in the Spanish–American War in 1898 had a dramatic impact on battleship design, as the question of the role of the fleet—namely, whether it should be focused on coastal defense or high seas operations—had been solved. The fleet's ability to conduct offensive operations overseas showed the necessity of a powerful fleet of battleships. As a result, the US Congress was willing to authorize much larger ships. Design work on what would become the Connecticut class began in 1901. The Secretary of the Navy submitted a request for a new battleship design on 6 March to the Board on Construction. Among the issues considered was the composition and placement of the secondary battery. The Board disliked the arrangement, as some members argued that guns in casemates could be fired faster.

The initial version of the Connecticut design, proposed by BuOrd, featured a secondary battery of twenty-four 7-inch guns with the same number of  guns for defense against torpedo boats. This design featured only eight 3-inch guns, which was deemed wholly insufficient to defend the ship from small craft.

In November, the Board agreed to a compromise design that incorporated a secondary battery of eight 8-inch guns in four twin turrets amidships and twelve 7-inch guns in casemates. The decision to retain the 8 in guns was made in large part due to American experiences in the Spanish–American War three years before. US Navy officers had been impressed with the performance of the gun at the Battle of Santiago de Cuba; despite scoring only 13 hits out of 309 shells fired, the gun had a flat trajectory and good range for its size. Armor protection was improved over the BuOrd design, with a thicker armored belt and casemate protection, albeit at the expense of thinner armor covering the barbettes that supported the gun turrets. The designers reasoned that since the barbettes were behind the belt and a transverse bulkhead, weight could be saved by reducing the level of direct protection.

As a result, they are sometimes referred to as the Vermont class. The six Connecticut-class ships were the most powerful pre-dreadnought type battleship built by the US Navy, and they compared well with contemporary foreign designs. They were nevertheless rendered obsolescent almost immediately due to the advent of the "all-big-gun" battleship epitomized by the British .

General characteristics and machinery

The ships had a flush deck, and they were better sea boats than preceding designs, many of which had poor stability. As built, the ships were fitted with two heavy military masts, but these were quickly replaced by lattice masts in 1909. They had a crew of 42 officers and 785 men.

The ships were powered by two-shaft triple-expansion steam engines, with steam provided by twelve coal-fired Babcock & Wilcox boilers. The boilers were trunked into three closely spaced funnels amidships. The first five ships were equipped with eight  electricity generators, while New Hampshire had four of these generators and two  units. Steering was controlled with a single rudder.

Armament

The ship was armed with a main battery of four /45 caliber Mark 5 guns in two twin gun turrets on the centerline, one forward and aft, as was typical for battleships of the period. The turrets were Mark VI mounts, which allowed for reloading at all angles of elevation. These mounts could elevate to 20 degrees and depress to -5 degrees. Each gun was supplied with sixty shells. New Hampshires magazines were rearranged compared to her sisters, which allowed for her to carry 20 percent more 12- and 7-inch shells, though under normal conditions she carried the same load.

The secondary battery consisted of eight /45 caliber guns and twelve /45 caliber guns; this mixed battery proved to be problematic, as shell splashes from the two types could not be distinguished. The 8-inch guns were mounted in four twin Mark XII turrets amidships and the 7-inch guns were placed in casemates in the hull. The 7-inch Mark I guns fired a  shell at 2,700 ft/s. These guns were later removed during World War I and converted for use on tracked gun carriages in France. The outfit per gun was 100 shells for both types.

For close-range defense against torpedo boats, they carried twenty /50 caliber guns mounted in casemates along the side of the hull and twelve  3-pounder guns. They also carried four  1-pounder guns. As was standard for capital ships of the period, the Connecticut class carried four  torpedo tubes, submerged in their hulls on the broadside. Each ship carried a total of 16 torpedoes. They were initially equipped with the Mark I Bliss-Leavitt design, but these were quickly replaced with Mark II, designed in 1905.

Armor
The last four ships' belts were reduced to a uniform 9 in between the main battery, with no change to the ends. It had 3 in thick sloped sides, which connected to the bottom edge of the belt. The deck was increased to 3 in forward and aft, where it was directly exposed to shellfire, also with 3 in thick sloped sides. New Hampshires belt was slightly shortened to permit a thicker deck over the magazines.

The secondary turrets had  of frontal armor, with 6 in on the sides and 2 in on the roofs. Their barbettes were given 6 in of armor plating on the outboard sides and 4 in inboard. The casemates for the 7-inch guns were 7 in thick and below the gun ports, the casemates reduced slightly to 6 in. For the last four ships, the savings in weight gained by reducing the thickness of the belt were used to increase the lower casement armor to 7 in. Those for the 3-inch guns were 2 in thick.

Ships

Service history

All six ships of the class served with the Atlantic Fleet for the duration of their careers. The first five ships took part in the cruise of the Great White Fleet in 1907–1909. The fleet left Hampton Roads on 16 December 1907 and steamed south, around South America and back north to the US west coast. The ships then crossed the Pacific and stopped in Australia, the Philippines, and Japan before continuing on through the Indian Ocean. They transited the Suez Canal and toured the Mediterranean before crossing the Atlantic, arriving bank in Hampton Roads on 22 February 1909. New Hampshire, which had not been completed in time to take part in the journey, met the fleet there during a naval review with President Theodore Roosevelt.

The ships then began a peacetime training routine off the east coast of the United States and the Caribbean, including gunnery training off the Virginia Capes, training cruises in the Atlantic, and winter exercises in Cuban waters. In late 1909, all six ships crossed the Atlantic to visit British and French ports. Louisiana and Kansas made another trip to Europe in early 1911. As political unrest began to erupt in several Central American countries in the 1910s, the ships became increasingly active in the region. All six ships became involved in the Mexican Revolution, including the occupation of Veracruz in April 1914; Vermont and New Hampshire were among the ships that contributed landing parties to the initial occupation of the city. Several men from the two ships were awarded the Medal of Honor during the action.

In July 1914, World War I broke out in Europe; the United States remained neutral for the first three years of the war. Tensions with Germany came to a head in early 1917 following the German unrestricted submarine warfare campaign, which sank several American merchant ships in European waters. On 6 April 1917, the United States declared war on Germany. The Connecticut-class ships initially were used for training gunners and engine room personnel that would be necessary for the rapidly expanding wartime fleet. In June 1918, New Hampshire and Louisiana were involved in a serious gunnery accident, where gunners aboard the former accidentally hit the latter, killing one and injuring several other men. The following month, Louisiana was used to test Arthur Pollen's Argo Clock, the first fire control system to use an analog computer to calculate firing solutions.

From late 1918, the ships were used to escort convoys part-way across the Atlantic. In late September, Minnesota struck a naval mine laid by the German U-boat U-117, causing serious damage that kept her out of service for five months. Convoy duty was cut short by the German surrender in November; thereafter, the Connecticuts were used to ferry American soldiers back from the battlefields of France. This work was completed by mid-1919. The ships briefly operated as training ships in the early 1920s, though under the terms of the Washington Naval Treaty, they were all sold for scrap by 1924 and broken up.

Footnotes

Notes

Citations

References

Further reading
 
 

Battleship classes
 
Connecticut class battleship